Sheila Mary Burrell (9 May 1922 – 19 July 2011) was a British actress. A cousin of Laurence Olivier, she was born in Blackheath, London, the daughter of a salesman. She attended St John's, Bexhill-on-Sea and the Webber Douglas Academy of Dramatic Art, London. Her first marriage to actor Laurence Payne was dissolved and she then married David Sim, a portrait and theatre photographer. She is primarily remembered in the United States for her performance as Lady Rochford in three episodes of the television series Six Wives of Henry VIII.

Theatre career
Burrell made her first appearance on the stage in 1942, playing Patsy in The Patsy, entertaining the troops, and made her first appearance in London at the Prince of Wales Theatre on 20 April 1944, as Rose in The Rest Is Silence.

Subsequent theatre credits include:
Chanticleer, June 1944, Sonja in Happily Ever After?
Liverpool, 1944, Katherine in The Taming of the Shrew
Arts, October 1944, Judy in The Bread-Winner
Arts, February 1944, Rosetta in Leonce and Lena
Chanticleer, March 1945, Maia Rubeck in When We Dead Awaken
Arts, April 1945, Celestine in An Italian Straw Hat
Arts, October 1947, Mrs Rosenberg in Smith
Dundee, 1947, Bathsheba in Monathan
Croydon and Embassy, during 1948, Louka in Arms and the Man, Gilda in Design for Living and Judy in The Shining Hour
Dublin Gate Theatre, 1948, Abdication, The Vigil and The Mountains Look Different
Lyric Hammersmith, March and Ambassadors' April 1949, Barbara Allen in Dark of the Moon
Embassy, July 1949, Elizabeth in Fit for Heroes
Touring, February 1950, as Anne Boleyn in The White Falcon
Duchess, April 1950, Clara in The Man With the Umbrella
Watergate, November 1950, Margot in The Typewriter
Q Theatre, February 1951, Letticia in The Watchman
New Boltons, April 1951, She in Happy and Glorious
Bristol Old Vic Company, 1951–52 season, Juliette in The Traveller Without Luggage, Curley's wife in Of Mice and Men, Perpetua in Venus Observed and Rosaline in Love's Labour's Lost
Vaudeville, May 1952, Linda Cooper in Sweet Madness
Embassy, March 1953, Rosina in The Herald Angels
Strand (for Repertory Players), May 1954, Elizabeth Glossop in Lola
Q Theatre, September 1954, Aimée in Finishing School
Bristol Old Vic, February 1956, Goneril in King Lear
Arts, April 1959, Sedra in Dark Halo
Connaught (Worthing), October 1960, Joanne in The Warm Peninsula
Theatre Royal, Bristol, May 1963, Honor Klein in A Severed Head, transferring to the Criterion, London, July 1963, in the same production
Royale, October 1964, first appearance in New York, Honor Klein in A Severed Head
Yvonne Arnaud, Guildford, February 1968, Shatov in Call Me Jackie
Royal Shakespeare Company, Stratford, 1970 season, Margaret in Richard III, Constance in King John and Lucetta in The Two Gentlemen of Verona
RSC Aldwych, December 1970, Lucetta in The Two Gentlemen of Verona
Watford Palace, May 1971, Nora Colerne in The Superannuated Man
Royal Court, August 1971, Mrs James in West of Suez, transferring to the Cambridge Theatre
National Theatre at the Old Vic, March 1972, Duchess of Gloucester in Richard II; then May 1972, Lady Sneerwell in The School for Scandal, November 1972, First Witch in Macbeth
Actors' Company, August 1974, Agave in The Bacchae, Madame Pernelle in Tartuffe and Madame Giry in The Phantom of the Opera
Actors' Company, June 1975, Monica in The Last Romantic
Round House, August 1978, Dame Purecraft in Bartholomew Fair
Soho Poly, April 1979, Evelyn in Personal Effects
Theatre Upstairs, August 1982, Enid in Salonika
Lyric Studio, June 1983, Exit the King
Duke of York's, April 1984, Mrs Amos Evans in Strange Interlude
Old Vic, January 1985, Great Expectations
Soho Poly, May 1986, Fail/Safe
Gate, April 1987, Dog Lady/The Cuban Swimmer
Mermaid (Shared Experience), February 1988, Nana
Old Vic, April 1990, Marya
Orange Tree, October 1991, Little Eyolf
NT Lyttelton, May 1995, Absolute Hell
Orange Tree, February 1997, Inheritors
New Ambassadors', July 1999, Last Dance at Dum Dum
NT Cottesloe, May 2001, Finding the Sun
Riverside, February 2002, Phaedra
Royal Court, November 2002, The Lying Kind
Orange Tree, March 2003, The House of Bernarda Alba

She listed her favourite stage roles as Barbara in Dark of the Moon, Honor Klein in A Severed Head and Queen Margaret in Richard III.

Selected filmography
 Man in Black (1949) – Janice
 The Rossiter Case (1951) – Honor
 Cloudburst (1951) – Lorna Dawson
 Black Orchid (1953) – Annette
 Women Without Men (1956) – Babs
 Blonde Bait (1956) – Bates (uncredited)
 The Dawn Killer (1959) – Mrs. Hoddy
 Paranoiac (1963) – Aunt Harriet
 Hell Is Empty (1967) – Judge
 The Desperados (1969) – Emily Galt
 Laughter in the Dark (1969) – Miss Porly
 Six Wives of Henry VIII, TV series (1970) - Lady Rochford
 American Roulette (1988) – Raul's Neighbour
 Afraid of the Dark (1991) – Meg
 Cold Comfort Farm (1995) – Ada Doom
 Jane Eyre (1996) – Lady Eshton
 The Woodlanders (1997) – Grandma Oliver
 Heartbeat (2004) – Nellie Pratt
 Emmerdale (2005, 2007) – Phyllis King

References

External links
 
 
 Obituary in The Guardian
 Obituary in The Telegraph

1922 births
2011 deaths
Alumni of the Webber Douglas Academy of Dramatic Art
English film actresses
English stage actresses
English television actresses
Actresses from London
Place of death missing